Kenaz ( Qənāz, "hunter") is the name of several persons in the Hebrew Bible.

 A son of Eliphaz, and a grandson of Esau. He was an Edomite leader. (Genesis 36:11, 15, 42). He may have been the ancestor of the Kenezites.
 Caleb's younger brother, and father of Othniel (Book of Joshua 15:17; Book of Judges 1:13; 1 Chronicles 4:13), whose Judahite family was of importance in Israel down to the time of David (1 Chronicles 27:15). Nothing more is said of Kenaz in the Hebrew Bible, but Pseudo-Philo (written c. AD 70) makes this Kenaz the first judge of Israel after Joshua, and includes several chapters of narrative about his supposed judgeship of 57 years.
 Caleb's grandson. (1 Chr. 4:15)

Edomite people
Book of Genesis people
Tribe of Judah
Book of Joshua
Book of Judges people
Books of Chronicles people
Set index articles on Hebrew Bible people